| tries ={{#expr: 
 + 7 + 1 + 1
 + 2 + 3 + 1
 + 3 + 3 + 4
}}
| top point scorer    = Matias Arocena (Uruguay)(34 points)
| top try scorer      = Florin Corodeanu (Romania)Dato Gasviani (Georgia)Howard Noble (Emerging Springboks)(2 tries)
| venue               = 
| attendance2         = 
| champions           = 
| count               = 2
| runner-up           = 
| website             = IRB Nations Cup
| previous year       = 2007
| previous tournament = 2007 IRB Nations Cup
| next year           = 2009
| next tournament     = 2009 IRB Nations Cup
}}
The 2008 IRB Nations Cup was the third edition of the international rugby union tournament, a competition created by the International Rugby Board.  It pits the "A" Teams of the stronger (Tier 1) rugby nations (Emerging Springboks and Italy A) against some of the Tier 2 and 3 nations (Romania, Georgia, Russia and Uruguay).

For the second consecutive year the event was held in Bucharest, Romania.  The Emerging Springboks were the overall winners for their second consecutive year.

The competition format was a modified round-robin whereby each team played 3 of the other 5 teams.  The competition was played over three match days, with three matches played consecutively on each day.

Final standings

Results

Round 1

Round 2

Round 3

Top scorers

Top points scorers

Source: irb.com

Top try scorers

Source: irb.com

See also 

2008 IRB Pacific Nations Cup

References

External links
IRB Overview
IRB Fixtures/Results
IRB Standings

2008
2008 rugby union tournaments for national teams
International rugby union competitions hosted by Romania
2007–08 in Romanian rugby union
2007–08 in Italian rugby union
2008 in South African rugby union
2008 in Argentine rugby union
2008 in Georgian sport
2008 in Uruguayan sport
Sport in Bucharest